Lepidokirbyia is a genus of moths in the family Erebidae. The genus was described by Travassos in 1943.

Species
Lepidokirbyia venigera
Lepidokirbyia vittipes

References

External links

Phaegopterina
Moth genera